Saint-Julien is a commune in the Côte-d'Or department in eastern France.

Population

Town partnerships
Saint-Julien fosters partnerships with Sankt Julian, Kusel district, Rhineland-Palatinate, Germany since 1985.

See also
Communes of the Côte-d'Or department

References

Communes of Côte-d'Or